Knut Roriksson a Danish Viking. He was the son of Rorik I. He was probably part of the Great Heathen Army, which in 865 invaded England. Knut thereafter participated in the various conflicts plaguing England, and was in 894 proclaimed King of Jórvík.

9th-century Danish people
9th-century English monarchs
Monarchs of Jorvik
Viking rulers
9th-century Vikings